Labastide-Esparbairenque is a commune in the Aude department in southern France.

The artist colony in the village, La Muse, was set up 16 years ago, by the writers John Fanning and Kerry Eielson.

Population

See also
Communes of the Aude department

References

Communes of Aude
Aude communes articles needing translation from French Wikipedia